Deerfield may refer to the following places in Wisconsin:
Deerfield, Wisconsin, a village in Dane County
Deerfield (town), Dane County, Wisconsin, a town in Dane County
Deerfield, Waushara County, Wisconsin, a town in Waushara County